Looney Tunes Golden Collection: Volume 5 is a Looney Tunes collection on DVD. Following the pattern of one release each year of the previous volumes, it was released on October 30, 2007.

The four discs in this collection are devoted to themes and subjects the cartoons in each disc have in common. The first disc consists entirely of cartoons starring the two top stars of Warner cartoons, Bugs Bunny and/or Daffy Duck.  The second disc consists entirely of cartoons which lampoon fairy tales. The third disc consists entirely of cartoons either directed or co-directed by Bob Clampett. The fourth disc titled "Early Daze" features rarely seen cartoons from the 1930s and early 1940s which were made in black-and-white.

Continuing a pattern which began with Looney Tunes Golden Collection: Volume 3, the DVD set has a warning in the beginning of each disc that states that some of the cartoons contain ethnic and racial stereotypes that may be offensive to modern audiences; however, like the fourth volume, the warning is shown on a title card rather than done as a special introduction.

Disc 1: Bugs Bunny and Daffy Duck
In previous installments of the Looney Tunes Golden Collection, disc 1 was an all Bugs Bunny. Disc 1 in this volume, however, contains cartoons featuring Daffy Duck as well.

Special features

Audio bonuses
 Music-only audio track on Ali Baba Bunny and Stupor Duck
 Music-and-effects-only audio track on The Abominable Snow Rabbit and The Super Snooper
 Audio commentaries
Greg Ford on Ali Baba Bunny
Paul Dini on A Pest in the House
Jerry Beck on Transylvania 6-5000
Eric Goldberg on You Were Never Duckier

From the Vaults
Chuck Jones: Extremes and In-Betweens documentary (2000) (Part 1)
 The Bugs Bunny Show
Bridging sequences for Bad Time Story
Mel Blanc audio recording sessions for What's Up, Dog?
General Foods commercials starring Bugs and company

Disc 2: Fun-Filled Fairy Tales

Special features

Audio bonuses
 Music-only audio track on Goldimouse and the Three Cats
 Music-only audio track on Red Riding Hoodwinked
 Music-only audio track on Tweety and the Beanstalk
 Music-and-effects-only audio track on Bewitched Bunny
 Music-and-effects-only audio track on The Turn-Tale Wolf
 Audio commentaries
Eric Goldberg on Bewitched Bunny
Daniel Goldmark on Holiday for Shoestrings
Mark Kausler on Little Red Walking Hood
Greg Ford on Red Riding Hoodwinked
Jerry Beck on Tom Thumb in Trouble

From the Vaults
 Chuck Jones: Extremes and In-Betweens documentary - (2000), (Part 2)
 2002 Featurette: A Chuck Jones Tutorial: Tricks of the Cartoon Trade

Behind the Tunes
 "Once upon a Looney Tune"
 "Drawn to Life: The Art of Robert McKimson".

Disc 3: Putting a Bob Clampett on It
All cartoons on this disc are directed by Bob Clampett.

Special features

Audio commentaries
Jerry Beck on Bacall to Arms
Michael Barrier on Buckaroo Bugs
Eddie Fitzgerald, John Kricfalusi, and Kali Fontecchio on Buckaroo Bugs
Keith Scott on Farm Frolics
Paul Dini on The Bashful Buzzard
Greg Ford on The Old Grey Hare
Eric Goldberg on The Wacky Wabbit
 Mark Kausler on The Daffy Doc
Michael Barrier on A Tale of Two Kitties

Behind the Tunes
"Wacky Warner One-Shots"
"Real American Zero: The Adventures of Private Snafu".

From the Vaults
 The director's cut of Hare Ribbin'.
 The Bashful Buzzard original storyboards.
 The Bashful Buzzard original opening music cue.
 Milt Franklyn opening themes with intro by Greg Ford.
 Private Snafu Cartoons: Coming!! Snafu and Gripes (both 1943).
 Seaman Hook Cartoons: The Good Egg, The Return of Mr. Hook, and Tokyo Woes (all 1945).

Disc 4: Early Daze
All cartoons on this disc are in black-and-white.

Special Features

Audio commentaries
Jerry Beck on Eatin' On The Cuff, or The Moth Who Came to Dinner
Daniel Goldmark on Porky at the Crocadero and Wholly Smoke
Greg Ford on Scrap Happy Daffy and Porky's Preview

From the Vaults
 Unsung Maestros: A Directors' Tribute—A salute to most of the lesser-known animation directors who had short tenures at the Schlesinger/Warner cartoon studio.  Directors profiled include Hugh Harman, Rudolf Ising, Jack King, Ub Iwerks, Ben Hardaway, Norman McCabe and Arthur Davis.
 Television Specials:
 Bugs Bunny's Looney Christmas Tales (1979)
 Bugs Bunny's Bustin' Out All Over (1980)
 Bugs and Daffy's Carnival of the Animals (1976)

References

External links

See also
 Looney Tunes and Merrie Melodies filmography
 Looney Tunes and Merrie Melodies filmography (1929–1939)
 Looney Tunes and Merrie Melodies filmography (1940–1949)
 Looney Tunes and Merrie Melodies filmography (1950–1959)
 Looney Tunes and Merrie Melodies filmography (1960–1969)
 Looney Tunes and Merrie Melodies filmography (1970–present and miscellaneous)
 List of Bugs Bunny cartoons

Looney Tunes home video releases